Amir is a title of rulers or military leaders in many Muslim countries, alternatively written as Emir.

Amir or Ameer may also refer to:

People
 Amir (name), people with the given name and surname Amir or Ameer
 Amir (singer) (born 1984), or Amir Haddad, Israeli-French singer

Places
 Amir, Israel, a small community in northern Israel
 Əmir, a village in Azerbaijan
 Amir, East Azerbaijan, a village in Iran
 Amir, Sistan and Baluchestan, a village in Iran
 Amir-e Olya, a village in Iran
 Amir-e Sofla, a village in Iran
 Band-e Amir, a series of six deep blue lakes in Afghanistan
 Khan Amir, Lorestan, a village in Iran

Arts, Entertainment, and media
 Ameer (film), a 1954 Indian film
 Amir, the main character in Khaled Hosseini's 2003 novel The Kite Runner
 Amir, a character in the television series Succession

Ships
 Ameer class escort carrier
 HMS Ameer (D01), a British warship
 SS Amir, a Kuwaiti coastal tanker

Titles
 Amir al-Mu'minin, an Arabic title usually translated "Leader of the Faithful
 Amir Arsalan, the full title Amir Arsalan -e Namdar, 19th-century popular Persian legend
 Amir (Iranian Army), a title for high-ranking officers

See also

 Emir (disambiguation)
 Amira (disambiguation)
 Admir, a Bosnian given name
 Almir (given name)
 Ami (disambiguation)
 Emir (disambiguation)
 Hammira (disambiguation)